Foolscap folio (commonly contracted to foolscap or cap or folio and in short FC) is paper cut to the size of  for printing or to  for "normal" writing paper (foolscap). This was a traditional paper size used in some parts of Europe, and the British Commonwealth, before the adoption of the international standard A4 paper.

A full (plano) foolscap paper sheet is actually  in size, and a folio sheet of any type is half the base sheet size.

ª Approximate measure in current use in Latin America: 216 x 341 mm.

Ring binders or lever arch files designed to hold foolscap folios are often used to hold A4 paper. The slightly larger size of such a binder offers greater protection to the edges of the pages it contains.

History

Europe
Foolscap was named after the fool's cap and bells watermark commonly used from the 15th century onwards on paper of these dimensions. The earliest example of such paper was made in Germany in 1479. Unsubstantiated anecdotes suggest that this watermark was introduced to England in 1580 by John Spilman, a German who established a papermill at Dartford, Kent. 

The general pattern of the mark was used by Dutch and English papermakers in the late 17th and 18th centuries, and as early as 1674 the term "foolscap" was being used to designate a specific size of paper regardless of its watermark.

Apocryphally, the Rump Parliament of 1648–1653 substituted a fool's cap for the royal arms as a watermark on the paper used for the journals of Parliament. According to the Oxford Dictionary of Word Origins, there is no basis in fact for this statement.

United States

Today in the United States, a half-foolscap sized paper for printing is standardized to 8½ × 14 inches, widely available and sold as "legal sized paper" for printing, writing, note-taking etc. A full foolscap size paper of 14 × 17 inches is also widely available for arts and crafts etc. alongside the 11 × 17 tabloid size.

In the United States in the 19th century, paper was sold either flat or folded in half. Folded foolscap was often 12 1/2 x 16, but smaller and larger sizes were also found. Legal foolscap (8 x 24 inches) was always sold ruled and folded in half at the printers by a folding machine, resulting in a leaflet 8x12 (almost the modern A4 8.27 x 11.69 inches, 21.0 x 29.7 cm)

There were numerous other sizes with variations on the "cap" name:
Flat Cap (14 x 17) (ie unfolded)
Small Flat Cap (or Law Blank Cap, Corporation Cap or Legal Cap) (13 x 16 inches)
Exchange Cap - thin, highly calendered, hard and strong paper used for bills of exchange, certificates and other blanks where light weight and ability to receive hard usages was required.
Drawing Cap, cold-pressed, for making drawing books and printing imitation antique work 
Double Cap Writing (17 x 28) for both writing and ledger papers.
Double Foolscap (26 1/2 x 16 3/4)

Oficio (mexican)
In Mexico, the foolscap folio paper size  / (21.6 cm x 34 cm)  is named (locally) oficio ('office').

F4

F4  is a paper size . Although metric, based on the A4 paper size, and named to suggest that it is part of the official ISO 216 paper sizes, it is only a de facto standard. 

References
Notes

Citations

External links 
The Collation. a gathering of scholarship from the Folger Library showing image of Foolscap folio watermark

Paper
Foolscap Folio (also called 'Folio')